Aktay is a rural locality (a selo) in Novogeorgiyevsky Selsoviet of Shimanovsky District, Amur Oblast, Russia. The population was 126 as of 2018. There is 1 street.

Geography 
Aktay is located 57 km southwest of Shimanovsk (the district's administrative centre) by road. Novogeorgiyevka is the nearest rural locality.

References 

Rural localities in Shimanovsky District